61st New York Film Critics Circle Awards
January 7, 1995

Best Picture:
 Leaving Las Vegas 
The 61st New York Film Critics Circle Awards honored the best filmmaking of 1995. The winners were announced on 14 December 1995 and the awards were given on 7 January 1996.

Winners
Best Actor:
Nicolas Cage - Leaving Las Vegas
Runners-up: Anthony Hopkins - Nixon, Jeff Bridges - Wild Bill and John Travolta - Get Shorty
Best Actress:
Jennifer Jason Leigh - Georgia 
Runners-up: Elisabeth Shue - Leaving Las Vegas, Julianne Moore - Safe, Nicole Kidman - To Die For, Meryl Streep - The Bridges of Madison County and Emma Thompson - Sense and Sensibility
Best Cinematography: 
Lü Yue - Shanghai Triad
Best Director:
Ang Lee - Sense and Sensibility
Runners-up: Mike Figgis - Leaving Las Vegas and Todd Haynes - Safe
Best Documentary: 
Crumb
Best Film:
Leaving Las Vegas
Runners-up: Sense and Sensibility and Safe
Best Foreign Language Film:
Wild Reeds (Les Roseaux sauvages) • France
Runners-up: Through the Olive Trees (Zire darakhatan zeyton) • Iran and Lamerica • Italy
Best New Director: 
Chris Noonan - Babe
Runners-up: Lodge Kerrigan - Clean, Shaven and Noah Baumbach - Kicking and Screaming
Best Screenplay: 
Emma Thompson - Sense and Sensibility
Runner-up: Amy Heckerling - Clueless
Best Supporting Actor:
Kevin Spacey - Swimming with Sharks, The Usual Suspects, Outbreak and Seven 
Runner-up: Don Cheadle - Devil in a Blue Dress
Best Supporting Actress:
Mira Sorvino - Mighty Aphrodite
Runner-up: Joan Allen - Nixon

References

External links
1995 Awards

1995
New York Film Critics Circle Awards
1995 in American cinema
New York
1995 in New York City